The 2017 Derby City Classic was a professional pool tournament held from the January 20 to 28, 2017 in Horseshoe Southern Indiana  in  Elizabeth,  Indiana. It was the 19th hosting the event. Competitions were held in the disciplines nine-ball,  ten-ball, one-pocket, straight, and bank pool. The event was the 2017 edition of the Derby City Classic.

The Master of the Table awarded for the best player overall was won by Dennis Orcollo who defeated Shane Van Boening 9–3 in the final of the nine-ball competition and won third place in the one-pocket competition.

Results

Bigfoot 10-Ball-Challenge 
The Bigfoot ten-ball challenge competition ran from January 20–24, 2017. Below is the results from the last-16 onwards.

References

External links

 Derby City Classic 2017 at sixpockets.de

2017 in cue sports
Derby City Classic